Communist attitudes towards LGBT rights have evolved radically in recent years. In the 19th and 20th century, communist parties and Marxist–Leninist states varied on LGBT rights; some were among the first political parties to support LGBT rights while others harshly persecuted people of the LGBT community (especially gay men).

History

Marxism

Early history 
Communist leaders and intellectuals took many different positions on LGBT-rights issues. Karl Marx and Friedrich Engels said very little on the subject in their published works and what they did say was contemptuous. Marx in particular commented rarely on sexuality in general.

The Encyclopedia of Homosexuality volume two is unequivocal on Marx and Engels view of homosexuality, stating: "There can be little doubt that, as far as they thought of the matter at all, Marx and Engels were personally homo-phobic, as shown by an acerbic 1869 exchange of letter on Jean Baptista von Schweitzer, a German socialist rival. Schweitzer had been arrested in a park on a morals charge and not only did Marx and Engels refuse to join a committee defending him, they resorted to the cheapest form of bathroom humor in their private comments about the affair."

One of the first important politicians to speak out in favour of gay rights in public debates was the German Marxist and co-founder of the Social Democratic Party of Germany, August Bebel. Although Bebel personally considered same sex relationships to be "against nature", he was among the signatories of Magnus Hirschfeld's petition from the Scientific-Humanitarian Committee to overturn Paragraph 175 from the German penal code. The bill brought before the Reichstag in 1898 was supported only by a minority from the Social Democratic Party of Germany led by Bebel. Among other signatories was the Marxist theoretician Karl Kautsky.

In 1895, Marxist theorist Eduard Bernstein of the Social Democratic Party of Germany wrote a defense of Oscar Wilde (who had been on trial for homosexual behavior) in Die Neue Zeit, a materialist critique of social attitudes concerning the subject of sexuality. Among other arguments he made, he stated that the characterization of homosexuality as "unnatural" was inappropriate, preferring "not the norm" instead. During the Weimar Republic, the Communist Party of Germany joined with the Social Democrats in support of efforts to legalize private homosexual relations between consenting adults.

The situation for LGBT rights in the first Communist government in Russia was somewhat mixed. In the early Soviet Union, the Communist Party abolished all oppressive Czarist laws in 1917 related to sexuality. In 1917 the Soviet government also decriminalised homosexuality, and the subsequent Soviet criminal code in the 1920s did not criminalize non-commercial same-sex sexuality between consenting adults in private. However, outside the Russian Soviet Federative Socialist Republic and Ukrainian SSR, homosexuality remained a criminal offense in certain Soviet republics in the 1920s (particularly the Muslim-dominated Soviet Republics in Central Asia) and Soviet policy was often inconsistent in terms of pursuing homosexual rights and wider legal/social equality for homosexual people. Official Soviet policy on homosexuality in the 1920s also fluctuated: between legal and social tolerance of homosexuals and homosexuality to state attempts to classify homosexuality as a mental disorder. In 1933, Article 121 was added to the entire Soviet Union criminal code, which made male homosexuality a crime punishable by up to five years in prison with hard labor. The precise reason for Article 121 is in some dispute among historians. The few official government statements made about the law tended to confuse homosexuality with pedophilia and was tied up with a belief that homosexuality was practiced only among fascists or the aristocracy. The law remained intact until after the dissolution of the Soviet Union; it was repealed in 1993.

LGBT people and communist party membership 
Gay men were sometimes denied membership or expelled from communist parties across the globe during the 20th century, as most communist parties followed the social precedents set by the USSR. However, this was not always the case in the West.

Notable LGBT+ members of communist parties include:

 Karl-Günther Heimsoth (German politician) – member of both the Communist Party of Germany (KPD) and Nazi Party. Continued feeding information to KPD's secret service after the Nazis seized power. Purged during the Night of the Long Knives.
 Harry Whyte (British Marxist and open critic of the criminalization of homosexuality in the Soviet Union in 1934, infamously dismissed as "an idiot and a degenerate" by Joseph Stalin in response to his letter arguing for the repeal of the law in question) – member of the Communist Party of Great Britain.
 Frida Kahlo (Mexican painter and political and social activist) – member of the Mexican Communist Party.
 Harry Hay (gay rights activist, labor advocate, Native American civil rights campaigner, Mattachine Society founder, co-founder of LA Gay Liberation Front and supporter of the North American Man/Boy Love Association a pederasty advocacy group) – member of the Communist Party USA.
 Leslie Feinberg (Transgender and lesbian rights activist, self described "anti-racist white, working-class, secular Jewish, transgender, lesbian, female, revolutionary communist.") – Member of Workers World Party
 Mark Ashton (founder of Lesbians and Gays Support the Miners and LGBT rights advocate) – member of the Communist Party of Great Britain.
 Georgy Chicherin - First People's Commissar for Foreign Affairs of the USSR and member of the Communist Party of the Soviet Union

Association of communism with homosexuality by anti-communists 

The phrase "" originated in Weimar Germany in the 1920s by Pastor Ludwig Hoppe of Berlin as a more general term of approbation at licentiousness. When Nazi Germany came into being after the failures of the Weimar government, the Nazis used the term "sexual Bolshevism" to refer to perceived sexual degeneracy, in particular homosexuality.

Association of fascism with homosexuality by communists 

In the early 1920s, Western communist party leaders propagated the view that the increase in homosexuality and the open discussion of homosexuality were caused by capitalism "in its death throes". In their view, homosexuality would vanish.

After Hitler's seizure of power (the ), Marxist intellectuals correlated fascism with homosexuality.

Events leading to the association of communism with homosexuality 
The advance of doctors, psychologists and social workers into the arena of human sexuality during the Weimar era (as well as the feminist movement) threw up a variety of conspiracy theories, especially amongst more conservative aspects of society, regarding communism and homosexuality. Any form of sexual revolution was derided as promiscuity and leading to a rise in sexually transmitted infections. The response of those who opposed "sexual Bolshevism" was to promote eugenics and family values.

There are specific events which glbtq.com ("an encyclopedia of gay, lesbian, bisexual, transgender and queer culture") claims to have contributed to the linkage of communism with homosexuality in the United States as well:
For example, in 1948, Whittaker Chambers, an editor and writer at Time magazine and a former Communist Party member and courier in a Soviet spy ring infiltrating the American government, accused Alger Hiss, head of the Carnegie Endowment, of perjury and, implicitly, of Soviet espionage. The vast media coverage of the scandal hinted that Chambers had a crush on Hiss, establishing a link between Communism and homosexuality. Chambers was only too eager to strengthen this link, declaring to the FBI that his homosexual activities had stopped once he had left the Communist Party. In addition, the 1951 flight to the Soviet Union of gay British spies Guy Burgess and Donald Maclean also helped fuel the association of homosexuality and treason in the public imagination.

Cold War 

During the height of the McCarthy era (in the late 1940s and early 1950s), American senator Joseph McCarthy viewed homosexuality and communism as threatening the "American way of life"; in both cases, "association with sickness and disease provided means of legitimating isolation from impressionable young people." Homosexuality was directly linked to security concerns, and more government employees were dismissed because of their sexual orientation than because they were left-winged or communist politically. George Chauncey noted that, "The specter of the invisible homosexual, like that of the invisible communist, haunted Cold War America," and homosexuality (and homosexuals) were constantly referred to not only as a disease, but also as an invasion, like the perceived danger of communism.

McCarthy often used accusations of homosexuality as a smear tactic in his anti-communist crusade, often combining the Second Red Scare with the lavender scare. On one occasion, he went so far as to announce to reporters, "If you want to be against McCarthy, boys, you've got to be either a Communist or a cocksucker." Some historians have argued that, in linking communism and homosexuality and psychological imbalance, McCarthy was employing guilt-by-association if evidence for communist activity was lacking.

Senator Kenneth Wherry similarly attempted to invoke a connection between homosexuality and anti-nationalism. He said in an interview with Max Lerner that "You can't hardly separate homosexuals from subversives." Later in that same interview he drew the line between patriotic Americans and gay men: "But look Lerner, we're both Americans, aren't we? I say, let's get these fellows [closeted gay men in government positions] out of the government."

Connections between gay rights groups and radical leftists were not merely a figment of the imaginations of demagogues. The Mattachine Society, one of the earliest gay rights groups in the United States, was founded by Harry Hay, a former member of the Communist Party USA, who was kicked out of the gay rights group he'd founded for his ties to the party.

Famous ex-communist former Soviet agent Whittaker Chambers notably spent his time in the left-wing underground pursuing both homosexual and heterosexual affairs, but he kept his liaisons quiet since his communist associates despised homosexuality. Chambers later monogamously married the pacifist painter Esther Shemitz, working as a journalist and editor.

Modern day 

Since the mid-1970s, most communist parties in the Western world have begun to adopt homosexual rights as part of their platform. Some communist parties such as the Communist Party of Greece and the Communist Party of the Russian Federation have rejected this move and continue to focus exclusively on worker politics and to promote homophobic policies.

The Communist Party of Greece voted against the Civil Partnerships Bill proposed by Syriza, responding that "with the formation of a socialist-communist society, a new type of partnership will undoubtedly be formed—a relatively stable heterosexual relationship and reproduction" The Communist Party of the Russian Federation and its Leader Gennady Zyuganov supported the Russian gay propaganda law.

LGBT rights by communist parties

LGBT rights by Marxist parties 

The Revolutionary Communist Party USA's previous policy that "struggle will be waged to eliminate [homosexuality] and reform homosexuals" was ended in 2001. The RCP has since then strongly supported LGBT rights.

Meanwhile, the American Socialist Workers Party (SWP) in the US released a memo stating that gay oppression had less "social weight" than black and women's struggles, and prohibited members from being involved in gay political organizations. They also believed that too close an association with gay liberation would give the SWP an "exotic image" and alienate it from the masses. Several non-governing communist parties have made statements supporting LGBT rights, such as the Communist Party USA, which supports extending marriage to same-sex couples and passing laws against discrimination based on one's sexual orientation. The League for the Revolutionary Party, a communist party based in New York City, issued a statement shortly after the passage of California's Proposition 8 condemning the amendment, reaffirming their support for same-sex marriage and expressing their views on how gay liberation is essential to the communist philosophy.

The New People's Army, a communist insurgency within the Philippines has also made several statements supporting equal rights of same-sex couples and gay individuals, performing the first same-sex marriage in the country and officially endorsing such legislation if they were to come to power. They also went further to express their support for same-sex relationships, and gays and lesbians were allowed to serve in their forces before those of the Philippines. Other communist parties present in Germany and other European countries have also officially endorsed LGBT rights, including the right to same-sex marriage, and some even have extensive LGBT platforms in their parties, such as the German Communist Party's "DKP Queer". The chairman of the Communist Party of Finland is openly homosexual and the party also participates in the LGBT working group of the European Left Party. In India, Communist Party of India (Marxist) (CPI(M)) and Communist Party of India have supported LGBT rights. Students' Federation of India, Democratic Youth Federation of India, All India Democratic Women's Association have actively supported LGBT rights. CPI(M) had called for amending Article 377 in 2009 and 2014, and supported an anti-discrimination bill covering LGBTQ in 2019, becoming one of the first major political party in India to do so.

The Communist Party of Great Britain (CPGB) viewed the working-class as male and heterosexually masculine. The accounts of gay party members show that homosexuality was widely seen as incompatible with a working-class identity during this era, despite Mark Ashton (founder of Lesbians and Gays Support the Miners) being General Secretary of the Young Communist League (the youth wing of the CPGB) "without compromising the politics of their sexuality".

LGBT rights by communist states

LGBT rights by current communist states 
, Cuba is the only country ruled by a Marxist-Leninist government that legalized same-sex marriage, civil unions and same-sex adoption.

Cuba 

Before the Cuban Revolution, Cuba had laws that criminalized homosexual men.  Even so, male homosexuality was an important part of the prostitution industry for tourists and the US military, but associated with gambling and criminal activity.

After the Revolution, the position regarding homosexuality continued to be primarily negative, and some LGBT people chose to emigrate, since homosexuality was associated with US imperialism and perceived as "bourgeoisie". However, the law that criminalized homosexuality was repealed in 1979. Since the late 1990s, public antipathy towards LGBT people eased, having implemented several educational campaigns on LGBT issues, including the National Center for Sex Education (CENESEX), organization of pride parades every May to coincide with the International Day Against Homophobia, Biphobia and Transphobia and marking the LGBT History Month.

The Communist Party of Cuba included the defense of LGBT rights in its regulations in 2013 and legalized same-sex marriage, civil unions, same-sex adoption and altruistic surrogacy, among other things, through amendments to the Cuban Constitution following the 2022 Cuban Family Code referendum.

Laos

People's Republic of China

Vietnam

LGBT rights in former communist states

Afghanistan

Albania 
The People's Socialist Republic of Albania penalized same-sex sexual intercourse with long prison terms, bullying and ostracism. Article 137 of the Crimes against Societal Moral of the Penal Code stated that: "Pederasty is punishable for up to ten years of freedom privation". The word "pederasty" was used as a code word for sex between two consenting adults or sex between an adult and a child of any gender.

Angola

Benin 
Same-sex sexual intercourse was always legal in the People's Republic of Benin. The People's Republic of Benin adopted a 1947 amendment to the Penal Code of 1877 under the Republic of Dahomey that fixed a general age limit of 13 for sex with a child of either gender, but penalized any act that is indecent or against nature if committed with a person of the same sex under 21: "Without prejudice to more severe penalties prescribed by the paragraphs that precede or by Articles 332 and 333 of this Code, shall be punished with imprisonment from six months to three years and a fine of 200 to 50,000 francs anyone who commits an indecent act or [an act] against nature with a minor ... of the same sex under 21 years old."

Bulgaria 
The People's Republic of Bulgaria retained the penal code of the Kingdom of Bulgaria, that criminalized male same-sex sexual intercourse over 16 years of age with at least six months of imprisonment. The Penal Code of 13 March 1951 increased the penalty to up to three years in jail. The revised Penal Code of 1 May 1968 legalized male same-sex intercourse.

Byelorussia (Byelorussian SSR)

Congo 
Same-sex sexual intercourse was always legal in the People's Republic of the Congo.

Czechoslovakia 
In 1962, the Czechoslovak Socialist Republic decriminalized same-sex sexual intercourse after scientific research from Kurt Freund led to the conclusion that homosexual orientation cannot be changed.

East Germany 

In the Soviet occupation zone of Germany, the development of law was not uniform. The government of Thuringia moderated Paragraphs 175 and 175a in a manner similar to that contemplated in the draft criminal code of 1925, while in the other states the 1935 version of the statute remained in effect without changes. Although in 1946 the Committee for Law Examination of East Berlin specifically advised not to include § 175 StGB in a new criminal code, this recommendation had no consequences. The Provincial High Court in Halle (or ) decided for Saxony-Anhalt in 1948 that Paragraphs 175 and 175a were to be seen as injustice perpetrated by the Nazis, because a progressive juridical development had been broken off and even been reversed. Homosexual acts were to be tried only according to the laws of the Weimar Republic.

In 1950, one year after being reconstituted as the German Democratic Republic (GDR), the Berlin Appeal Court decided for all of East Germany to reinstate the validity of the old, pre-1935 form of Paragraph 175. From 1953 to 1957, following Uprising of 1953 in East Germany, the GDR government instituted a program of "moral reform" to build a solid foundation for the new socialist republic, in which masculinity and the traditional family were championed while homosexuality, seen to contravene "healthy mores of the working people", continued to be prosecuted under Paragraph 175. Same-sex sexual intercourse was "alternatively viewed as a remnant of bourgeois decadence, a sign of moral weakness, and a threat to the social and political health of the nation."

In 1954, the same court decided that Paragraph 175a in contrast to Paragraph 175 did not presuppose acts tantamount to sexual intercourse. Lewdness was defined as any act that is performed to arouse sexual excitement and "violates the moral sentiment of our workers". A revision of the criminal code in 1957 made it possible to put aside prosecution of an illegal action that represented no danger to socialist society because of lack of consequence. This removed Paragraph 175 from the effective body of the law, because at the same time the East Berlin Court of Appeal decided that all punishments deriving from the old form of Paragraph 175 should be suspended due to the insignificance of the acts to which it had been applied. On this basis, homosexual acts between consenting adults ceased to be punished, beginning in the late 1950s.

In 1968, homosexuality was officially decriminalised in East Germany.

Gay social clubs and groups were allowed to organize themselves freely, so long as they made tenuous links with Protestant Churches. This was because the official position of the ruling Socialist Unity Party of Germany was to outlaw discrimination on the basis of sexual orientation, but to otherwise ignore that LGBT relationships existed. On 1 July 1968, the GDR adopted its own code of criminal law. In it § 151 StGB-DDR provided for a sentence up to three years' imprisonment or probation for an adult (18 and over) who engaged in sexual acts with a youth (under 18) of the same sex. This law applied not only to men who have sex with boys but equally to women who have sex with girls. According to historian Heidi Minning, attempts by lesbians and gay men in East Germany to establish a visible community were "thwarted at every turn by the G.D.R. government and SED party." She writes:
Police force was used on numerous occasions to break up or prevent public gay and lesbian events. Centralized censorship prevented the presentation of homosexuality in print and electronic media, as well as the import of such materials.

In the late 1980s, the East German government opened a state-owned gay disco in Berlin. In 1987, the age of consent was equalized for same-sex intercourse in East Germany. On 11 August 1987 the Supreme Court of East Germany struck down a conviction under Paragraph 151 on the basis that "homosexuality, just like heterosexuality, represents a variant of sexual behavior. Homosexual people do therefore not stand outside socialist society, and the civil rights are warranted to them exactly as to all other citizens." The act passed into law 30 May 1989. This removed all specific reference to homosexuality from East German criminal law. In 1989, the German film titled Coming Out directed by Heiner Carow was exhibited on the night that the Berlin wall came down, and tells a story of an East German man coming to accept his own homosexuality, with much of it shot in the local gay bars. This was the only East German LGBT rights film.

Ethiopia 
The Provisional Military Government of Socialist Ethiopia and People's Democratic Republic of Ethiopia adopted the previous Penal Code of 1957 of the Ethiopian Empire, which criminalizes anyone who "performs with another person of the same sex an act corresponding to the sexual act, or any other indecent act, is punishable with simple imprisonment."

Grenada

Hungary 
The Hungarian People's Republic adopted the penal code of the Kingdom of Hungary which punished male same-sex sexual intercourse with prison up to 1 year. In 1961, male same-sex sexual intercourse above the age of 20 was decriminalized. In 1978, a new penal code lowered the age of consent to the age of 18 years old.

North Korea

Mongolia 
In 1961, same-sex sexual intercourse was criminalized in the Mongolian People's Republic.

Mozambique

Poland 
Same-sex sexual intercourse was always legal during the existence of the Republic of Poland and the Polish People's Republic. Nevertheless, Michel Foucault recounted that after his arrival in Poland in 1959 as the director of the French Cultural Center, the Polish secret police "trapped him by using a young [male] translator" and then "demanded his departure" from Poland, an example of a honey trapping. In the 1980s, the government used homosexuality to blackmail homosexuals, and the police harassed gay men and lesbians. Many homosexual men were arrested in 1985 in Operation Hyacinth.

The 2020 novel Swimming in the Dark by Tomasz Jedrowski presents a fictionalized depiction of LGBTQ life in the Polish People's Republic.

Romania 
The Romanian People's Republic and the Socialist Republic of Romania adopted the Romanian Penal Code of 1937 from the Kingdom of Romania, which banned public "acts of sexual inversion committed between men or between women, if provoking public scandal". In 1948, this "public" homosexuality was considered by the courts to include all situations whatever public or private if "provoking scandal", thus homosexuality became de facto illegal. In the new Penal Code of the Romanian People's Republic, the old Article 431 was toughened with penalties up to a minimum of two years and a maximum of five years. In 1957 the "public scandal" provision was repealed and any consenting sexual intercourse between persons of the same sex is criminalized. After Nicolae Ceaușescu's rise to power, in 1968, the basic code was again revised, introducing Article 200 and moving the infraction from the public domain into the private:

Article 200 was useful to the Ceaușescu regime in that, since 1970, it could strengthen social control. These restrictions under the Penal Code were strictly unique to Romania among European countries. The restrictions only included relationships and those who considered themselves homosexual were not punished but were instead considered as mentally ill.

Somalia 
Under Article 409 of the Somali Penal Code introduced in 1973, sexual intercourse with a person of the same sex is punishable by imprisonment from three months to three years in the Somali Democratic Republic. An "act of lust" other than sexual intercourse is punishable by a prison term of two months to two years. Under Article 410 of the Somali Penal Code, an additional security measure may accompany sentences for homosexual acts, usually coming in the form of police surveillance to prevent "re-offending". Threats have been made that indicate that Somalia tolerates executions of homosexuals.

South Yemen

Soviet Union 

In November 1917, after the October Revolution, the Tsarist criminal code was abrogated by the Bolsheviks, thus legalizing same-sex sexual intercourse between consenting adults in the Russian Soviet Federative Socialist Republic and the later Ukrainian Soviet Socialist Republic (SSR). The Bolsheviks took an official position at this time that homosexuality was not of harm and was more a scientific concern than a legal concern. However this policy was not uniform across all the Soviet Republics which emerged after 1922. The Armenian Soviet Socialist Republic, Byelorussian Soviet Socialist Republic, Russian Soviet Federative Socialist Republic, and Ukrainian SSR were all created with no laws criminalising same-sex sexual intercourse. In 1923, sexual intercourse between men became a criminal offense in the Azerbaijan Soviet Socialist Republic, punishable by up to five years in prison for consenting adults, or up to eight years if it involved force or threat.

In 1926, Uzbek Soviet Socialist Republic criminalized male same-sex intercourse. In 1927, Turkmen Soviet Socialist Republic criminalized male same-sex intercourse. Male same-sex intercourse was also illegal in Bukharan People's Soviet Republic, Georgian Soviet Socialist Republic, Nakhichevan ASSR, and Socialist Soviet Republic of Abkhazia.

The Soviet Union sent delegates to the German Institute for Sexual Science, as well as to some international conferences on human sexuality including the World League for Sexual Reform, who expressed support for the legalization of adult, private, and consensual homosexual relations. According to the Scientific-Humanitarian Committee, which was affiliated with the institute, the Ministry of Health delegation was positively receptive to a film concerning the topic and considered it unworthy of scandal.

Soviet social policy in the 1920s regarding homosexuality and homosexual rights was mixed. On the one hand homosexuality was legal in the Russian and Ukrainian Soviet Republics and certain political and civil rights in the Soviet Union were extended to homosexuals. On the other hand, there was increasing pressure from both within and outside the Soviet government to recriminalise homosexuality and to reinstate bans on homosexual intercourse. In the late 1920s Soviet medical research increasingly came to classify homosexuality as a mental disease or as a remnant of bourgeois society.

Relative Soviet tolerance for homosexuality and homosexual rights ended in the late 1920s – as Soviet society came increasingly under Stalinist control. In the 1930s, along with increased repression of political dissidents and non-Russian nationalities under Stalin, LGBT themes faced official government censorship, and a uniformly harsher policy across the entire Soviet Union. Homosexuality was officially labelled a disease. The official stance could be summarized in the article of the Great Soviet Encyclopedia of 1930 written by medical expert Sereisky:

Soviet legislation does not recognize so-called crimes against morality. Our laws proceed from the principle of protection of society and therefore countenance punishment only in those instances when juveniles and minors are the objects of homosexual interest ... while recognizing the incorrectness of homosexual development ... our society combines prophylactic and other therapeutic measures with all the necessary conditions for making the conflicts that afflict homosexuals as painless as possible and for resolving their typical estrangement from society within the collective
—Sereisky, Great Soviet Encyclopedia, 1930, p. 593

In 1934, the Soviet government recriminalised homosexuality in the Soviet Union. Mass arrests occurred in several cities in Russia, including Moscow, and many artists were arrested. On 7 March 1934, Article 121 was added to the criminal code, throughout the entire Soviet Union, that expressly prohibited only male same-sex sexual intercourse with up to five years of hard labor in prison. There were no criminal statutes regarding same-sex female sexual intercourse. During the Soviet period, Western observers believed that between 800 and 1,000 men were imprisoned each year under Article 121.

Some historians have noted that it was during this time that Soviet propaganda began to depict homosexuality as a sign of fascism, and that Article 121 may have a simple political tool to use against dissidents, irrespective of their true sexual orientation, and to solidify Russian opposition to Nazi Germany, who had broken its treaty with Russia. More recently, a third possible reason for the anti-gay law has emerged from declassified Soviet documents and transcripts. Beyond expressed fears of a vast "counterrevolutionary" or fascist homosexual conspiracy, there were several high-profile arrests of Russian men accused of being pederasts. In 1933, 130 men "were accused of being 'pederasts' – adult males who have sex with boys. Since no records of men having sex with boys at that time are available, it is possible this term was used broadly and crudely to label homosexuality." Whatever the precise reason, homosexuality remained a serious criminal offense until it was repealed in 1993.

The Soviet government itself said very little publicly about the change in the law, and few people seemed to be aware that it existed. In 1934, the British Communist Harry Whyte wrote a long letter to Stalin condemning the law, and its prejudicial motivations. He laid out a Marxist position against the oppression of homosexuals, as a social minority, and compared homophobia to racism, xenophobia and sexism. While the letter was not formally replied to, Soviet cultural writer Maxim Gorky authored an article, published in both Pravda and Izvestia titled "Proletarian Humanism", that seemed to reject Whyte's arguments point by point. He rejected the notion that homosexuals were a social minority, and argued that the Soviet Union, governed by "manly proletariat", is obliged to persecute homosexuals to protect the youth from their corrupting effect. It is often said that he equated homosexuality with fascism, stating that "exterminate all homosexuals and fascism will vanish". He was actually quoting a popular saying, Gorky in fact said: "There is already a sarcastic saying: Destroy homosexuality and fascism will disappear." In 1936, Justice Commissar Nikolai Krylenko publicly stated that the anti-gay criminal law was aimed at the decadent and effete old ruling classes.

During Nikita Khrushchev's regime, the Khrushchev government believed that absent a criminal law against same-sex sexual intercourse, the sex between men that occurred in the prison environment would spread into the general population as they released many Stalin-era prisoners. Whereas the Stalin government conflated homosexuality with pedophilia, the Khrushchev government conflated homosexuality with the situational, sometimes forced, sex acts between male prisoners.

In 1958, the Interior Ministry sent a secret memo to law enforcement ordering them to step up enforcement of the anti-gay criminal law. Yet, during the late 1950s – early 1960s, Aline Mosby, a foreign reporter in Russia at the time, attributed to the more liberal attitude of the Khrushchev government the fact that she saw some gay couples in public and that it was not uncommon to see men waiting outside of certain theaters looking for dates with male performers.

A 1964 Soviet sex manual instructed: "With all the tricks at their disposal, homosexuals seek out and win the confidence of youngsters. Then they proceed to act. Do not under any circumstances allow them to touch you. Such people should be immediately reported to the administrative organs so that they can be removed from society."

Imprisonment for male same-sex sexual intercourse and government censorship of homosexuality and LGBT rights did not begin to slowly relax until the early 1970s. Venedikt Yerofeyev was permitted to include a brief interior monologue about homosexuality in Moscow to the End of the Line (1973). Perhaps the first public endorsement of LGBT rights since Stalin was a brief statement, critical of Article 121 and calling for its repeal, made in the Textbook of Soviet Criminal Law (1973). These references were characterized as being brief statements in a novel or textbook and were made by heterosexuals. Victor Sosnora was allowed to write about witnessing an elderly gay actor being brutally murdered in a Leningrad bar in The Flying Dutchman (1979), but the book was only allowed to be published in East Germany. When the author was gay and, in particular, if they were seen as supporting gay rights, the censors tended to be much harsher.

Russian gay author Yevgeny Kharitonov illegally circulated some gay fiction before he died of heart failure in 1981. Author Gennady Trifonov served four years of hard labor for circulating his gay poems and, upon his release, was allowed to write and publish only if he avoided depicting or making reference to homosexuality. In 1984, a group of Russian gay men met and attempted to organize an official gay rights organization, only to be quickly shut down by the KGB. It was not until later in the Glasnost period that public discussion was permitted about re-legalizing private, consensual adult same-sex sexual intercourse.

A poll conducted in 1989 reported that homosexuals were the most hated group in Russian society and that 30 percent of those polled felt that homosexuals should be liquidated. In a 1991 public opinion poll conducted in Chelyabinsk 30 percent of the respondents aged 16 to 30 years old felt that homosexuals should be "isolated from society", 5 percent felt they should be "liquidated", 60 percent had a "negative" attitude toward gay people and 5 percent labeled their sexual orientation "unfortunate". In 1989–1990 a Moscow gay rights organization led by Yevgeniya Debryanskaya was permitted to exist, with Roman Kalinin given permission to publish a gay newspaper, Tema. The precise number of persons prosecuted under Article 121 is unknown, with the first official information was released only in 1988, but it is believed to be about 1000 prosecuted a year. According to official data, the number of men convicted under Article 121 had been steadily decreasing during the Glasnost period. In 1987, 831 men were sentenced under Article 121; in 1989, 539; in 1990, 497; and in 1991, 462.

Ukraine (Ukrainian SSR)

Yugoslavia 

During World War II, Yugoslav Partisans whose homosexuality was revealed were subject to regular expulsion from their detachments, and in one known case a death sentence. After World War II, the repression of LGBT in Yugoslavia effectively began; LGBT people were labeled by communists as "enemies of the system" and "a product of insatiable capitalism" and were also prohibited from joining the Communist Party of Yugoslavia. When the Socialist Federal Republic of Yugoslavia was formed, it adopted the Yugoslav Criminal Code of 1929, a previous law of the Kingdom of Yugoslavia which forbade "lewdness against the order of nature" (anal intercourse) between people. The Socialist Federal Republic of Yugoslavia later restricted the offense in 1959 to only apply to male same-sex anal intercourse, but with the maximum sentence reduced from two years to one year imprisonment. Around five hundred male homosexuals have been imprisoned between 1951 and 1977, about half of which served probation, and some others served shorter sentences. For comparison, many Western European countries (such as West Germany, United Kingdom and Italy) convicted several tens of thousands homosexuals during the same period.

In the 1970s, following the sexual revolution in much of Western Europe, the legal and social sphere of Yugoslavia started to liberalize towards LGBT rights. In 1973, the Croatian Medical Chamber removed homosexuality from its list of mental disorders. In 1974, Yugoslavia adopted a new federal constitution which resulted in the abolition of the federal penal code, allowing each socialist republic to create their own. SR Slovenia was the first republic to hold discussions in favor of decriminalizing homosexuality. The League of Communists of Yugoslavia held debates on the topic at least three times until 1976, when it requested decriminalization in all republics. In 1977, the Socialist Autonomous Province of Vojvodina, Socialist Republic of Croatia, Socialist Republic of Montenegro and Socialist Republic of Slovenia enacted their own individual penal codes and decriminalized male same-sex anal intercourse. Male same-sex anal intercourse remained illegal in the Socialist Republic of Bosnia and Herzegovina, Socialist Republic of Macedonia and the Socialist Republic of Serbia, excluding the Socialist Autonomous Province of Vojvodina (so including Socialist Autonomous Province of Kosovo).

In 1985, Toni Marošević became the first openly gay media person, and briefly hosted a radio show on Omladinski radio that dealt with marginal socio-political issues, before it was removed at request of right-wing newspapers Večernji list and Večernje novosti. He later revealed that he had been asked on several occasions by the League of Communists of Croatia to form an LGBT faction of the party. The first lesbian association (Lila initiative) in Croatia was formed in 1989, but ceased to exist a year later. In 1990, Vojvodina was reincorporated into the legal system of Serbia, and male same-sex anal intercourse once again become a criminal offense, until 1994.

Notable LGBT communists

LGBT Marxists

LGBT former Marxists

See also 

 Gay Left
 History of communism
 LGBT rights
 New Left
 Pink capitalism
 Queer anarchism
 Socialism and LGBT rights

References

Notes

Bibliography 
 
 
 
 Heidi Minning. Who is the 'I' in "I love you"?: The negotiation of gay and lesbian identities in former East Berlin, Germany. Anthropology of East Europe Review, Volume 18, Number 2, Autumn 2000
 
 

Communism
LGBT rights
Marxism–Leninism
Socialism and LGBT topics